The Moose Jaw Canucks were a junior ice hockey team based in Moose Jaw, Saskatchewan, Canada. They were one of the founding members of the Western Canada Junior Hockey League (known today as the Western Hockey League) in 1966 following a rebellion within the Saskatchewan Junior Hockey League. The franchise evolved from the Moose Jaw Cubs in the early 1930s.

The Canucks won the Abbott Cup in 1945 and 1947, making them the Junior "A" Champion for Western Canada and earning a playoff against the George Richardson Memorial Trophy winning Eastern Champion for the Memorial Cup.  The Canucks lost their Memorial Cup competition against the Toronto St. Michael's Majors in both years.

Franchise history
The Canucks played in the following leagues in their history:
Prior to 1936: Independent schedule
1936–1946: Southern Saskatchewan Junior Hockey League
1946–1948: Saskatchewan Junior Hockey League
1948–1955: Western Canada Junior Hockey League
1958–1966: Saskatchewan Junior Hockey League
1966–1968: Western Canada Junior Hockey League
1968–1984: Saskatchewan Junior Hockey League
 
In 1984, the Canucks folded to make room for the WHL's Moose Jaw Warriors when the franchise transferred from Winnipeg.
Another team, also known as the Moose Jaw Canucks played in the South Saskatchewan Junior B Hockey League (now known as the Prairie Junior Hockey League) from 1992–94.
The Canucks legacy is survived by the Jr. C Canucks, who have played in the Saskatchewan Junior C Hockey League since 2006.

WCJHL history
In the summer of 1966, the Canucks were one of five SJHL clubs that left the provincial league to join franchises in Calgary and Edmonton in the new Western Canada Junior Hockey League. The league was considered a "rebel league" by the Canadian Amateur Hockey Association, and thus denied the right to compete for Canadian junior hockey's top prize, the Memorial Cup.

In the WCJHL's inaugural season, the Canucks won the league championship despite finishing 4th in the overall standings. The following year, the Canucks would lose out in the league semi-finals after another 4th-place finish.

Concerned about the WCJHL's poor reputation with the CAHA and hoping to once again compete for the Memorial Cup, the Canucks, along with the Regina Pats and Weyburn Red Wings, would leave the WCJHL to return to the reborn SJHL. Following the reorganization of junior hockey in 1970, which saw the Western Canada Hockey League gain Tier-I status, the Canucks attempted to rejoin the WCHL but were denied. The Canucks would remain in the Tier-II SJHL until the arrival of the Warriors.

Season-by-season standings

Playoffs
1969 Lost Semi-final
Regina Pats defeated Moose Jaw Canucks 4-games-to-none
1970 Lost Semi-final
Weyburn Red Wings defeated Moose Jaw Canucks 4-games-to-none
1971 Did Not Participate
1972 DNQ
1973 Lost Quarter-final
Weyburn Red Wings defeated Moose Jaw Canucks 4-games-to-1
1974 Lost Quarter-final
Estevan Bruins defeated Moose Jaw Canucks 4-games-to-none
1975 DNQ
1976 DNQ
1977 Lost Quarter-final
Melville Millionaires defeated Moose Jaw Canucks 4-games-to-2
1978 Lost Final
Moose Jaw Canucks defeated Weyburn Red Wings 4-games-to-1
Moose Jaw Canucks defeated Regina Blues 4-games-to-1
Prince Albert Raiders defeated Moose Jaw Canucks 4-games-to-1
1979 Lost Final
Moose Jaw Canucks defeated Regina Blues 4-games-to-1
Moose Jaw Canucks defeated Melville Millionaires 4-games-to-none
Prince Albert Raiders defeated Moose Jaw Canucks 4-games-to-2
1980 Lost Final
Moose Jaw Canucks defeated Melville Millionaires 4-games-to-1
Moose Jaw Canucks defeated Estevan Bruins 4-games-to-2
Prince Albert Raiders defeated Moose Jaw Canucks 4-games-to-2
1981 Lost Final
Moose Jaw Canucks defeated Weyburn Red Wings 4-games-to-1
Moose Jaw Canucks defeated Estevan Bruins 4-games-to-none
Prince Albert Raiders defeated Moose Jaw Canucks 4-games-to-3
1982 Lost Quarter-final
Weyburn Red Wings defeated Moose Jaw Canucks 4-games-to-2
1983 Lost Semi-final
Moose Jaw Canucks defeated Humboldt Broncos 4-games-to-none
Weyburn Red Wings defeated Moose Jaw Canucks 4-games-to-3
1984 Lost Quarter-final
Lloydminster Lancers defeated Moose Jaw Canucks 4-games-to-1

Notable alumni
Chris Chelios
Willie Desjardins
Al Rollins
Larry Popein
Fred Sasakamoose

See also
 List of ice hockey teams in Saskatchewan

References

External links
whl.ca

Defunct Western Hockey League teams
Defunct Saskatchewan Junior Hockey League teams
Defunct ice hockey teams in Saskatchewan
Sport in Moose Jaw
Sports clubs disestablished in 1984
1984 disestablishments in Saskatchewan